, also known by his Chinese style name , was a bureaucrat of Ryukyu Kingdom.

Inoha Seiki was the second son of Tomigusuku Seiryō. He served as a member of Sanshikan from 1665 to 1688.

Motobu magiri was established in 1666, and was given to him as a hereditary fief. He was also the first head of an aristocrat family called Mō-uji Inoha Dunchi.

References

|-

Ueekata
Sanshikan
People of the Ryukyu Kingdom
Ryukyuan people
17th-century Ryukyuan people
1619 births
1688 deaths